The 1989 PSA Men's Singer World Open Squash Championship is the men's edition of the 1989 World Open, which serves as the individual world championship for squash players. The event took place in Kuala Lumpur in Malaysia from 03-7 October 1989. Jansher Khan won his second World Open title, defeating Chris Dittmar in the final.

Seeds

Draw and results

Notes
The reign of Jahangir Khan had ended and was taken up by Jansher Khan who would win eight titles.

References

See also
PSA World Open
1989 Women's World Open Squash Championship

External links
World Squash History

M
World Squash Championships
1989 in Malaysian sport
Squash tournaments in Malaysia
International sports competitions hosted by Malaysia